Han Tuozhou (November 6, 1152 – November 24, 1207) was a Chinese politician of the Southern Song dynasty, who served as a chancellor under Emperor Ningzong.

He was responsible for Southern Song efforts to recover territories lost in northern China to the Jurchen Jin dynasty in their 1142 peace settlement that ended the Jin–Song war. In his efforts to begin a military build-up, he had Yue Fei (who had resigned during peace talks with the Jurchen, after which he was jailed and poisoned) posthumously promoted and Qin Hui (who led the aforementioned peace talks with the Jurchen) demoted. These efforts were unsuccessful, and the ensuing war was devastating to southern China, resulting in further territorial losses and terrible inflation.  In consequence, Han was executed by the Song regime, and his head offered to the Jurchens as a peace offering.

Han Tuozhou is also famous for his opposition to daoxue (the Song Neo-Confucianist movement) which was banned on his order during the years 1195–99. His antagonizing policies were reversed by his successor in office, Shi Miyuan (史彌遠).

Han was assassinated by bludgeoning in 1207, on his way to the imperial palace. This was an exceptional affair in the generally tolerant political atmosphere of the Song. Yuan dynasty historiographers assigned the blame of assassination on Shi Miyuan. However, such judgement is questioned. More plausibly, his extermination was ordered by Empress Yang who succeeded the deceased niece of Han Tuozhou, Empress Han (d.1200)

Han's and Su Shidan's (蘇師旦, subordinate of Han) bodies were exhumed and presented to Jin as compensation for the Song's aggression, in the negotiation process carried out by Wang Nan and Xu Yi. This measure was probably undertaken as compensation for the humiliation of Jin confederate Wu Xi (吳曦), whose body was hung on displays in Xingzhou (興州, in modern Lueyang, Shaanxi) and Lin'an. On some accounts, Jin provided Han with honorary burial, recognizing him as a loyal official.

References 

1152 births
1207 deaths
Assassinated Chinese politicians
Song dynasty chancellors